Shahbad Daulatpur is a Village located in Rohini, North West District in Union Territory of Delhi, India.

Demographics
Sahibabad Daulat Pur has a population of 5,472 according to the 2011 census. Males constitute 51% of the population and females 49%. In the 2000s, the average literacy rate was 74%; 86% of males and 62% of females. Sixteen percent of the population is under six years of age. The town hosts the world-renowned Delhi Technological University and a few schools. The town is locally known as Shahbad Daulatpur. It comes under the constituency of Bawana Delhi. The nearest railway station is at Badli.

Cities and towns in North West Delhi district